The following television stations broadcast on digital channel 21 in Mexico:

 XHAPB-TDT in La Paz, Baja California Sur 
 XHAPF-TDT in Acatlán de Pérez Figueroa, Oaxaca
 XHAPZ-TDT in Apatzingán, Michoacán
 XHBTB-TDT in Bahía Tortugas, Baja California Sur
 XHCCN-TDT in Cancún, Quintana Roo 
 XHCDM-TDT in Mexico City
 XHCGJ-TDT in Ciudad Camargo, Chihuahua
 XHCHM-TDT in Ciudad Hidalgo, Michoacán
 XHCTAC-TDT in Acapulco, Guerrero
 XHCTMZ-TDT in Mazatlán, Sinaloa
 XHCTPU-TDT in Puebla, Puebla
 XHDI-TDT in Durango, Durango 
 XHDR-TDT in Manzanillo, Colima
 XHDTV-TDT in Tecate, Baja California
 XHECH-TDT in Chihuahua, Chihuahua 
 XHEFT-TDT in Escárcega, Campeche 
 XHFEC-TDT in San Felipe, Baja California
 XHFET-TDT in San Fernando, Tamaulipas 
 XHGPE-TDT in Pénjamo, Guanajuato
 XHGPV-TDT in Puerto Vallarta, Jalisco
 XHGTD-TDT in Tarandacuao, Guanajuato 
 XHHN-TDT in Guaymas, Sonora 
 XHIOC-TDT in Isla Socorro, Colima 
 XHMJI-TDT in Jiquilpan de Juárez, Michoacán
 XHMST-TDT in Magdalena de Kino, Sonora 
 XHPAH-TDT in Pachuca, Hidalgo
 XHPAO-TDT on Cerro Palma Sola, Oaxaca 
 XHPPS-TDT in Puerto Peñasco, Sonora 
 XHSAW-TDT in Sabinas Hidalgo, Nuevo León 
 XHSDD-TDT in Sabinas, Coahuila
 XHSIM-TDT in Los Mochis, Sinaloa 
 XHSIN-TDT in Culiacán, Sinaloa 
 XHSIS-TDT in San Isidro, Baja California Sur
 XHSPRCO-TDT in Colima, Colima
 XHTAU-TDT in Tampico, Tamaulipas 
 XHTAZ-TDT in Tamazunchale, San Luis Potosí 
 XHTLO-TDT in Tlaxiaco, Oaxaca 
 XHVBM-TDT in Valle de Bravo, México 

21